Jorge Mario Olguín (born 17 May 1952 in Dolores, Buenos Aires) is a retired Argentine footballer who played as a defender. He is perhaps most famous for having been part of the 1978 World Cup winning team. Since his retirement as a player he has managed a number of football clubs.

Playing career

Mostly deployed as a centre back in club football, Olguín was positioned as a right back with the national team by coach César Luis Menotti. Among his achievements as a player there is one World Cup with the Argentina national football team, the Copa Libertadores, and six Argentine league titles.

He started his career at San Lorenzo in 1971, he played for the club for 8 years, in that time they won three trophies (1972 Metropolitano, 1972 Nacional and 1974 Nacional).

In 1978 Olguín was included in Argentina's world cup squad. Following his success at the world cup he was sold to Independiente, where he spend some time battling Pedro Monzón for a place in the first team.

Olguín was called up to join Argentina's defence of the world cup in Spain 1982, but the Albicelestes has a poor campaign, being knocked out in the 2nd group phase.

In 1983 Olguín won his only trophy with Independiente, they claimed the 1983 Metropolitano, finishing 1 point above his former team, San Lorenzo.

In 1984 Olguín was sold to Argentinos Juniors, where he won a further 2 league titles. In 1985 he helped Argentinos win their first and only Copa Libertadores title. He continued to play for Argentinos until his retirement in 1988.

Managerial career

After retirement as a player Olguin has become a football manager, he has taken charge of teams in Argentina, Japan and Costa Rica.

 Argentinos Juniors
 Colón
 Almagro
 Deportivo Español
 Avispa Fukuoka
 Deportivo Saprissa
 Club Santa Bárbara
 Liga Deportiva Alajuelense
 Villa Dálmine

Player statistics

 Argentina (1976–1982): Games 60 Goals 0.
 Argentine Primera (1971–1988): Games 529 Goals 53.

Honours

Club
San Lorenzo
Metropolitano: 1972
Nacional: 1972, 1974

Independiente
Metropolitano: 1983

Argentinos Juniors
Metropolitano: 1984
Nacional: 1985
Copa Libertadores: 1985
Copa Interamericana: 1986

International
Argentina
FIFA World Cup: 1978

References

External links

 San Lorenzo player profile
 Profile and Statistics at Futbolistasblogspotcom.blogspot.com

1952 births
Living people
Argentine footballers
Argentina international footballers
FIFA World Cup-winning players
1978 FIFA World Cup players
1982 FIFA World Cup players
San Lorenzo de Almagro footballers
Club Atlético Independiente footballers
Argentinos Juniors footballers
Argentine Primera División players
Sportspeople from Buenos Aires Province
Argentine football managers
Deportivo Español managers
Argentinos Juniors managers
Club Atlético Colón managers
Almagro managers
Expatriate football managers in Japan
Deportivo Saprissa managers
L.D. Alajuelense managers
Expatriate football managers in Costa Rica
Association football defenders